Albert Tomàs Sobrepera (born December 19, 1970) is a former Spanish football player.

Club statistics

References

External links

odn.ne.jp

1970 births
Living people
Spanish footballers
Spanish expatriate footballers
J1 League players
La Liga players
Segunda División players
Segunda División B players
FC Barcelona players
FC Barcelona C players
FC Barcelona Atlètic players
UE Lleida players
Albacete Balompié players
CD Toledo players
Levante UD footballers
Gimnàstic de Tarragona footballers
CE Sabadell FC footballers
Vissel Kobe players
Spanish expatriate sportspeople in Japan
Expatriate footballers in Japan
Association football defenders
Catalonia international footballers
Footballers from Barcelona